Peter Ward may refer to:

Peter Ward (athlete) (1913–2009), English athlete who competed for Great Britain in the 1936 Summer Olympics
Peter Ward (footballer, born 1955), retired English footballer, played for Brighton & Hove Albion and Nottingham Forest
Peter Ward (footballer, born 1964), retired English footballer, played for Huddersfield Town, Rochdale, Stockport County, Wrexham and Morecambe
Peter Ward (paleontologist) (born 1949), paleontologist and professor at the University of Washington, Seattle
Peter Ward (rugby union) (1876–1943), Australian rugby player
Peter Ward (swimmer) (born 1963), Canadian swimmer
Peter J. Ward (1891–1970), Irish politician
Peter Langdon Ward (born 1943), geophysicist
Pete Ward (1937-2022), Canadian Major League Baseball player
Panaiotis, aka Peter Ward, vocalist and composer